The Chief Information Commissioner of India is the head of the Central Information Commission appointed by the President of India. The first Chief Information Commissioner was Wajahat Habibullah. First woman Chief Information Commissioner was Deepak Sandhu. After the retirement of the 10th Chief Information Commissioner, Bimal Julka on November 7, 2020, Yashwardhan Kumar Sinha had been appointed as the 11th CIC of India. The tenure of the commissioners has been cut to three years in the new rules.

The following have held the post of the Central Information Commissioners.

References

Commissions in India